Soseong of Silla (died 800) (r. 798–800) was the 39th to rule  the Korean kingdom of Silla.  He was the grandson of King Wonseong, his father Kim In-gyeom having died before he could take the throne.  He married Lady Gyehwa, the daughter of the daeachan Suk-myeong.

Soseong died only nineteen months after taking the throne. This brought on a renewal of the succession strife which typified later Unified Silla.

Soseong of Silla, who was raised in the royal court before he ascended the throne, was given a royal rite in 789, and went to the Tang dynasty in 790. He was appointed to the Si-jung in October 791, but retired due to illness in August the following year. When Uncle Uiyoung died early in 794, he was proclaimed Crown Prince in the year 795.

Family 

Grandfather: Wonseong of Silla
Grandmother: Queen Kim (Lady Yeonhwa)(숙정부인 김씨), of the Kim clan
Father: Prince Hyechung (혜충태자) (750–791/792), posthumously named King Hyechung (혜충왕)
Mother: Queen Seongmok, of the Kim clan ( 성목태후 김씨)
Wife:
Queen Gyehwa, of the Kim clan (계화부인 김씨)
Son: Aejang of Silla (788–809) (애장왕)–was the 40th ruler of the Korean kingdom of Silla
Son: Prince Chemyeong (체명)
Daughter: Madame Janghwa (장화부인)– became the Queen consort of Heungdeok of Silla

See also 
Unified Silla
List of Korean monarchs
List of Silla people

References

Silla rulers
800 deaths
Year of birth unknown
8th-century Korean monarchs
9th-century Korean monarchs